Springeratus xanthosoma is a species of clinid native to coastal areas of the western Pacific and Indian Ocean.  It can reach a maximum length of  TL.

References

External links
 Photograph of example from Taiwan
 Photograph of example from Bali

xanthosoma
Fish described in 1857